Roberta A. Stevens is an American librarian. From 2010 to 2011, she was president of the American Library Association.

Life 
She graduated from State University of New York at Buffalo, and State University of New York at Binghamton.

She worked at the Fairfax County Public Library, and the Library of Congress.

References

External links

 
 

American librarians
American women librarians
Presidents of the American Library Association
Living people
Year of birth missing (living people)
21st-century American women